The Rock 'n' Roll Rumble (sometimes stylized "Rock & Roll Rumble"; formerly the "WBCN Rock 'n' Roll Rumble"), begun in 1979, is a Greater Boston "battle of the bands" competition sponsored by Boston Emissions, an online local music program formerly broadcast on WBCN (from 1987 until 2008) and WZLX (from 2009 until 2018). The Rumble remains the longest running event of its kind in the US.

Its predecessors were the Bicentennial Tournament of the Bands held in 1976 at The Club in Cambridge, Massachusetts, and co-sponsored by WBCN and Inn Square Men's Bar, as well as 1978's First Annual Spring Rock 'n' Roll Festival co-sponsored by WBCN and the Boston Phoenix.

The Rock 'n' Roll Rumble was held in Boston at the Rathskeller in  Kenmore Square for its first two years and was often referred to as "the Rumble at the Rat". Steve Morse of the Boston Globe called the 1979 debut competition "nine nights of exhilarating grass-roots rock." Since then, the competition's venue has changed several times but remains a popular showcase for New England bands to gain visibility.

The Rumble is hosted and produced by Boston DJ Anngelle Wood, host of Boston Emissions.

The 2020 Rumble was originally scheduled to begin on April 9, 2020, but was first postponed, and then canceled, due to the COVID-19 pandemic. The Rumble is scheduled to return in April 2023.

Format
The Rumble in its current form begins in April with six preliminary rounds of 24 total bands, as selected by Anngelle Wood. Through 2017, the prelims took place on Sunday through Tuesday and Thursday through Saturday, with Wednesday as a traditional "Day of Rest"; beginning in 2019, the prelims were split over two consecutive weekends. Each night, four bands play a 30-minute set and are judged by a rotating selection of representatives from the Boston music industry. A winner is announced at the end of the night.

Each night's winner moves on to the semi-finals the following weekend, with two wildcard bands rounding out the top 8. The two semi-final winners are joined by one wildcard band for the final round the week after that. A special guest, often a national touring band or a previous Rumble participant, headlines the finals while the judges come to their final decision.

Prizes include cash, studio time, legal services, album production, bragging rights, and more. A ceremonial tiara is also passed from the previous year's winning act to the newly crowned champion.

Eligibility
While no band applies to play the Rumble, there are certain requirements for consideration. They include, but are not limited to:
 Band or artist must have sent music to, and received airplay by, local music director
 Band or artist should be established in the music community and actively playing out in the area.
 Band or artist must have released a recording, EP or full-length, within the past calendar year.

Judging criteria
As of 2012, The Rumble uses 45 judges (barring unforeseen circumstances), five for each night for the nine nights of competition. Each evening there are representatives from the music business, local media, and on-air personalities from local radio judging the bands.  The judges observe each band and numerically score each 30-minute set. At the end of the night, the judges' scores are tallied two ways:
 a straight tally of all judges' scores; and
 a tally throwing out the high and low scores, using the middle scores as a backup in case of a tie or in the rare case of extreme bias in either direction.  This method is intended to protect the bands against judging anomalies in the long run. 
As of 2014, the judging criteria were slightly revised, based on the discovery of a score card from 1981; the most notable change was the addition of a "stage presence" category. In 2017 the "Bonus" category changed from optional to mandatory.

1. Material:
Were songs good, memorable? Did they all sound the same?  (possible 1–10 points)

2. Playing Effectiveness:
How well did the band play? Were they tight? Intriguing? How did the band represent their genre?  (possible 1–10 points)

3. Vocal Effectiveness:
How well did vocals (lead & backups) contribute to & enhance band?  (possible 1–10 points)

4. Timing:
Did band use set time wisely? Did set flow? Did it build in intensity? Did band stop too long? Were they on time?  (possible 1–10 points)

5. Stage Presence:
How did band present itself? Mannerisms? Banter? Were they fun to watch? Did they interact? Did crowd respond?  (possible 1–10 points)

6. Bonus:
Category to grant extra points based on any judge's discretion, or the intangibles not covered above; an explanation is requested from the judge. (possible 1–5 points)

History

* = wildcard from preliminary round

‡ = wildcard from semifinal round

x = withdrew from competition

§ = runner-up in preliminary round; re-entered competition due to another band's withdrawal

Notable circumstances

1995: Pooka Stew, then one of the area's top-drawing live rock acts, were two songs into their finals set when the power to the PA in the Middle East went off without explanation. The band finished their set without the PA, which came on again for eventual winner Doc Hopper's set. In their finals set, Doc Hopper destroyed a toilet onstage with sledge hammers.

1999: After a tie in the semifinals, which would have given a three-way final matchup, WBCN introduced a wild card into the final round.

2010: There was no Rock 'n' Roll Rumble this year, due to the reorganization of CBS Radio's Boston stations and the loss of WBCN's FM broadcast.

2011: Jenny Dee and the Deelinquents made Rumble history by becoming the first band to drop out of the competition, due to a scheduling conflict, after winning their preliminary night.  This allowed a previously eliminated band, OldJack, to re-enter the competition in the semifinal round, having been the runner-up on the night that Jenny Dee won.

2012: The Grownup Noise withdrew from the Rumble (prior to performing) due to an injury sustained by one of its members; they were invited back as the non-competing guest band to play at the finals.

2013: Night two of the semifinals was postponed due to the lockdown of the city during the April 19 manhunt for the Boston Marathon bombing suspects.

2014: FEINTS withdrew from the competition, prior to their semifinal performance, due to illness. Yellabird, as runner-up in the preliminary round, assumed their place in the semifinals.

2017: Past Rumble winners (Goddamn Draculas, Zip-Tie Handcuffs, Eddie Japan, Girls Guns and Glory, John Powhida International Airport) played early, stripped-down shows in the lounge area of Once as part of a "Winner Winner Come For Dinner" promotion during the preliminary nights.

A fire alarm during the finals forced the evacuation of the Once Ballroom during Carissa Johnson's set. Johnson went on to win the Rumble.

2018: In November 2017, Boston Emissions host station WZLX was sold to iHeartMedia, and the transition and reorganization forced a postponement of the 2018 Rumble. 

2020: The Coronavirus pandemic forced the postponement of the 2020 Rumble; two bands, OroborO and The Only Things, withdrew from the competition, as they were unable to play the rescheduled July dates.

References

Sources
 New England Music Scrapbook
 The Noise

American radio programs
Culture of Boston
Music festivals established in 1979
1979 establishments in Massachusetts